Wamba is a global social networking service for meeting new people, which was first launched as “Mamba” in 2003. According to the company, it was the first freemium social networking site in the world.

Background 
Wamba was first launched as “Mamba” in 2003. According to the company, it was the first freemium social networking site in the world. Mamba was created by a small team interested in the future of social communication online.

In July 2012, the service was rebranded internationally as Wamba. The service can be accessed through other domains belonging to white-label partners, (such as Msn, Icq, Yahoo, or Mail.ru) and through Wamba's own domains such as Mamba and Mamboo.

Audience 
Over 100 million users have registered with Wamba, and the service currently has over 25 million active users worldwide.

Funding 
70% of the company is held by the investment company Finam, the other 30% belongs to Digital Sky Technologies (DST) (Mail.ru Group).

References

Russian social networking websites
Internet properties established in 2002